Jo Gladsøy Sunde (born 27 April 2003) is a Norwegian beach volleyball player. His best result is gold medal in 2022 Volleyball World Beach Pro Tour Warsaw Future together with Markus Mol. He also has a fourth place in 
Montpellier Future (2022)  together with Nils Ringøen. Together with Markus Mol he got silver medal in 2021 European U20 Beach Volleyball Championships.

References

External links
 
 
 

2003 births
Living people
Norwegian beach volleyball players